Antonio Annibale (10 February 1940 – 20 May 2018) was an Italian footballer.

References

External links

1940 births
2018 deaths
Italian footballers
Serie A players
Inter Milan players
A.C. Cesena players
Calcio Lecco 1912 players
Pisa S.C. players
Rimini F.C. 1912 players
Association football goalkeepers
Footballers from Milan